Microprudential regulation or  microprudential supervision is firm-level oversight or financial regulation by regulators of financial institutions, "ensuring the balance sheets of individual institutions are robust to shocks".

Aims
The motivation for micro-prudential regulation is rooted in consumer protection: ensuring solvency of financial institutions strengthens consumer confidence in the individual firms and the financial system as a whole. In addition, if a large number of financial firms fail at the same time, this can disrupt the overall financial system. Therefore, micro-prudential regulation also reduces systemic risk.

Standards
Micro-prudential regulation involves enforcing standards, e.g. the Basel III global regulatory standards for bank capital adequacy, leverage ratios and liquidity.

References

See also
 Macroprudential regulation

Consumer protection
Financial regulation
Systemic risk
Business cycle